Columbus Square may refer to:

 Columbus Square (Madrid)
 Columbus Square, New York City
 Columbus Square (Providence)
 Columbus Square, St. Louis